The 1994 Big East Conference baseball tournament was held at Muzzy Field in Bristol, Connecticut. This was the tenth annual Big East Conference baseball tournament. The Connecticut Huskies won their second tournament championship and claimed the Big East Conference's automatic bid to the 1994 NCAA Division I baseball tournament.

Format and seeding 
The Big East baseball tournament was a 4 team double elimination tournament in 1994. The top four regular season finishers were seeded one through four based on conference winning percentage only.

Bracket

Jack Kaiser Award 
Chris Bisson was the winner of the 1994 Jack Kaiser Award. Bisson was a sophomore first baseman for Connecticut.

References 

Tournament
Big East Conference Baseball Tournament
Big East Conference baseball tournament
Big East Conference baseball tournament
College baseball tournaments in Connecticut
Bristol, Connecticut
Sports competitions in Hartford County, Connecticut